Doc Elliot is an American medical drama series that aired on ABC from October 10, 1973 until May 1, 1974.

Premise
Dr Benjamin R. Elliot (James Franciscus) is a successful New York City doctor who decided to leave Bellevue Hospital, drop out of the big-city rat race, and take on a new job as a doctor in Gideon, in the backwoods of southern Colorado. Most of his house calls had to be made via plane or four-wheel drive vehicles as his practice covered over 600 square miles. Mags Brimble (Neva Patterson) is the widow of the former town’s doctor, who became Elliot’s helper. Barney Weeks (Noah Beery) owns the town’s general store. Eldred McCoy (Bo Hopkins) works as a bush pilot.

Cast
James Franciscus as Dr. Ben Elliot
Neva Patterson as Mags Brimble
Bo Hopkins as Eldred McCoy
Noah Beery as Barney Weeks

Episodes

References

External links
IMDb
TV.com
TV Guide

1973 American television series debuts
1974 American television series endings
1970s American drama television series
1970s American medical television series
English-language television shows
American Broadcasting Company original programming
Television shows set in Colorado
Television series by Lorimar Television